Halmor Hull Emmons (November 22, 1814 – May 14, 1877) was a United States circuit judge of the United States Circuit Courts for the Sixth Circuit.

Education and career

Born in Keeseville, New York, Emmons read law to enter the bar. He was in private practice in Keeseville and Essex, New York in 1837, in Cleveland, Ohio from 1837 to 1838, and then in Detroit, Michigan until 1870.

Federal judicial service

Emmons was nominated by President Ulysses S. Grant on January 10, 1870, to the United States Circuit Courts for the Sixth Circuit, to a new seat authorized by 16 Stat. 44. He was confirmed by the United States Senate on January 17, 1870, and received his commission the same day. His service terminated on May 14, 1877, due to his death in Detroit.

References

Further reading

External links
 
Judge Halmor Emmons Built a Country Home in "Swampy Ecorse"

1814 births
1877 deaths
19th-century American judges
Judges of the United States circuit courts
People from Keeseville, New York
United States federal judges appointed by Ulysses S. Grant